Adam Gordon (September 16, 1831 – May 28, 1876) was a Scottish-born merchant and political figure in Ontario, Canada. He represented Ontario North in the House of Commons of Canada from 1874 to 1876 as a Liberal member.

He was born in Forfar, the son of William Gordon, and came to Whitby, Upper Canada with his family in 1838. Gordon served as deputy reeve for Mariposa Township and as deputy reeve and reeve for Reach Township. He was also postmaster for Manchester, Ontario. Gordon died in office in Port Perry at the age of 44.

References 

1831 births
1876 deaths
Members of the House of Commons of Canada from Ontario
Liberal Party of Canada MPs
People from Forfar
People from Scugog